The women's shot put at the 2013 World Championships in Athletics was held at the Luzhniki Stadium on 11–12 August.

Over the previous 6 years, Valerie Adams had been virtually unbeatable by any legal thrower.  This year was more of the same.  From the home of the world record (more than 26 years earlier), she took the lead on her first toss at a distance only one other competitor would equal in the competition.  Michelle Carter moved into second place with her first round 19.92, while she improved it slightly in the second round, Gong Lijiao threw one centimeter better.  Meanwhile, Adams improved on her second and third attempts, reaching 20.88. m. That would be the competition until the final round, when Christina Schwanitz pulled out at 21 cm personal best improvement to rocket from fifth place into second.

Records
Prior to the competition, the records were as follows (in m.):

Qualification standards

Schedule

Results

Qualification
Qualification: Qualifying Performance 18.70 (Q) or at least 12 best performers (q) advance to the final.

Final
The final was held at 20:25.

References

External links
Shot put results at IAAF website

Shot put
Shot put at the World Athletics Championships
2013 in women's athletics